James F. O'Brien is a computer graphics researcher and professor of computer science and electrical engineering at the University of California, Berkeley.  He is also co-founder and chief science officer at Avametric, a company developing software for virtual clothing try on. In 2015, he received an award for Scientific and Technical Achievement from the Academy of Motion Pictures Arts and Sciences.

Education
O'Brien received a Bachelor of Science in 1992 from Florida International University. He then did his graduate work under the supervision of Dr. Jessica Hodgins at Georgia Tech's GVU Center. He received his doctorate in Computer Science from the Georgia Institute of Technology College of Computing in 2000 for a thesis entitled Graphical Modeling and Animation of Fracture.

Berkeley
He joined UC Berkeley's Computer Science department as a faculty member in 2000. Prof. O'Brien runs the Berkeley Computer Animation and Modeling Group and his research focuses primarily on physically based animation, 3D modeling, and audio simulation.

Awards
 SIGGRAPH Impact Award (1999)
 Technology Review TR100 (2004)
 Sloan Fellowship (2004)
 College of Engineering Distinguished Alumni, Florida International University (2006)
 GVU 15 Impact Award
 Jim and Donna Gray Endowment Award for Excellence in Undergraduate Teaching (2008)
 The Academy of Motion Pictures Arts and Sciences Award for Scientific and Technical Achievement ( A Sci-Tech Oscar, 2015 )

Research and professional activities

O'Brien has published an extensive collection of research papers on topics such as surface reconstruction, human figure animation, mesh generation, physically based animation, surgical simulation, computational fluid dynamics, and fracture propagation.

O'Brien served as a consultant on the development of the game physics engine Digital Molecular Matter (DMM). To date, this game engine has been used in Star Wars: The Force Unleashed and an off-line version of it was used for special effects in the film Avatar, Sucker Punch, Source Code, X-Men: First Class, and more than 60 other feature films.

In 2015, his work on developing DMM was recognized by the Academy of Motion Picture Arts and Sciences with a Technical Achievement award. The citation reads:

"To Ben Cole for the design of the Kali Destruction System, to Eric Parker for the development of the Digital Molecular Matter toolkit, and to James O’Brien for his influential research on the finite element methods that served as a foundation for these tools. The combined innovations in Kali and DMM provide artists with an intuitive, art-directable system for the creation of scalable and realistic fracture and deformation simulations. These tools established finite element methods as a new reference point for believable on-screen destruction."

References

External links
 Home page at U. C. Berkeley
 Computer Graphics Group at U. C. Berkeley
 Berkeley Computer Animation and Modeling Group
 Article in FIU Magazine
 Article in Time Magazine
 Author profile in ACM Digital Library

Computer graphics professionals
Living people
Georgia Tech alumni
Year of birth missing (living people)
Florida International University alumni
UC Berkeley College of Engineering faculty
Christopher Columbus High School (Miami-Dade County, Florida) alumni